Grangeville is a Canadian unincorporated community, located in Kent County, New Brunswick. The community is situated in southeastern New Brunswick, to the northwest of Moncton. Grangeville is located mainly on the New Brunswick Route 126.

History

Notable people

See also
List of communities in New Brunswick

References

Bordering communities

Kent Junction
Adamsville, New Brunswick
Emerson, New Brunswick
Harcourt, New Brunswick

Communities in Kent County, New Brunswick